Brown's Ford Access consists of  in Jefferson County, Missouri northwest of De Soto. The access is owned and managed by the Missouri Department of Conservation and provides access to the Big River via a boat launch.

References

Protected areas of Jefferson County, Missouri
Conservation Areas of Missouri